Kahnak (also Romanized as Kohnak; also known as Kahang) is a village in Abarshiveh Rural District, in the Central District of Damavand County, Tehran Province, Iran. At the 2006 census, its population was 103, in 37 families.

References 

Populated places in Damavand County